The Miami Gardens Police Department or MGPD, often referred to as the City of Miami Gardens Police, is the chief police department of the U.S. city of Miami Gardens, Florida. Its headquarters located at 18601 NW 27th Ave, Miami Gardens, Florida.

There is one patrolling district and seven neighborhoods for which the following districts are responsible:

Andover
Bunche Park 
Carol City
Lake Lucerne
Norland, Florida
Opa-Locka North
Scott Lake

The department also patrols Hard Rock Stadium, and the Calder Casino & Race Track.

In 2013, serious allegations of civil rights abuses and sweeping misconduct were made against the department. The podcast “This American Life” covered these allegations in-depth in their episode “Cops See it Different: Part 2”

Chiefs of Police
Matthew Boyd 2007-December 2013
Paul Miller (acting) December 2013-May 2014
Stephen Johnson May 2014-February 2015
Antonio Brooklen (acting) February 2015-November 2015
Antonio Brooklen November 2015-October 1, 2016
Cynthia Machanic (acting) October 1, 2016-May 1, 2017
 Delma Noel-Pratt May 1, 2017-present

References 

Miami Gardens, Florida
2007 establishments in Florida